Pink Lady or The Pink Lady may refer to:

Arts and entertainment
 The Pink Lady (musical), a 1911 musical by Ivan Caryll
 Pink Lady (art), a short-lived 1966 painting on a rock face near Malibu, California
 Pink Lady (duo), a 1970s–80s Japanese pop music duo
 Pink Lady (1979 album), a studio album by the duo
 Pink Lady (1981 album), a compilation album by the duo
 Pink Lady Monogatari, a 1978 Japanese anime based on the duo
 Pink Lady (TV series) or Pink Lady and Jeff, a 1980 American television show starring the duo
 Pink Lady (manhwa), a 2000s Korean manhwa, originally a web cartoon
 The Pink Ladies, female companions of the T-Birds in the two Grease movies and their stage musicals
 Pink Lady (card game), a variant of Hearts and Black Lady

Food and medicine
Cripps Pink, an apple cultivar sold under the brand name Pink Lady
Pink Lady (cocktail), a gin-based cocktail, popular in the United States in the 1920s and 30s
Pink lady (medicine), a drug cocktail used to treat gastroesophageal reflux
Pink lady, a denaturant mixture added to discourage World War II-era US Navy submariners from drinking torpedo juice

Transportation
Pink Lady (quartzite), railroad track ballast
The Pink Lady (aircraft), a B-17G Flying Fortress bomber
 Ella's Pink Lady, the yacht used by Australian sailor Jessica Watson during her round-the-world voyage

People
 Hazel Dawn (1890–1988), nicknamed "The Pink Lady" and one of the stars of the musical of the same name
 Ri Chun-hee (born 1943), nicknamed "The Pink Lady", a North Korean news presenter
"The Pink Lady", a smear nickname given to American politician Helen Douglas (1900–1980) by opponents to imply Communist sympathies